M/A/R/C Research is a marketing research and consulting firm. M/A/R/C designs and conducts custom qualitative and quantitative, traditional and online surveys. Mainly, the firm is known for measuring attitudes and behaviors to accurately explain and predict market share, revenue and bottom-line impact of a client's actions.

History 

M/A/R/C was founded in 1965 by Cecil "Bud" Phillips who had previously led the research team at TracyLocke in Dallas.  Originally called Marketing and Research Counselors, the company name was later shortened to M/A/R/C Research.

In November 1999, M/A/R/C was acquired by Omnicom Group Inc., a marketing and corporate communications company. In 2018, CEO Merrill Dubrow finalized the purchase of M/A/R/C Research from Omnicom.

Quick Facts
Founded—1965 
Employees—70
Headquarters—Irving, Texas 
Additional offices -- Greensboro, St. Louis, Chicago, Philadelphia, New York
CEO—Merrill Dubrow
Industry—Market Research

References 

Companies based in Irving, Texas
Business services companies established in 1965
1965 establishments in Texas
1999 mergers and acquisitions